Huizhanzhongxin station may refer to:
Huizhanzhongxin station (Tianjin Metro), a station on Line 9 of Tianjin Metro
Huizhanzhongxin station (Xi'an Metro), a station on Line 2 of Xi'an Metro

See also 
 Convention Center station (disambiguation)
 Exhibition station (disambiguation)
 Exhibition Center station (disambiguation)